Eastern Star may refer to:

Order of the Eastern Star,  Freemasonry-related fraternal organization
Eastern Star Baptist Church, historic Baptist church in Tarboro, Edgecombe County, North Carolina, United States
MV Eastern Star, or Dong Fang Zhi Xing, Chinese ship
Eastern Star FC,  football club from Vientiane, Laos

See also
Eastern Stars F.C.
 East Star (disambiguation)